Moolia is one of the 51 union councils of Abbottabad District in Khyber-Pakhtunkhwa province of Pakistan. According to the 2017 Census of Pakistan, the population is 13,005.

Subdivisions
 Moolia
 Sangal

References

Union councils of Abbottabad District